Quşçu (also, Kushchu) is a village in the Lachin Rayon of Azerbaijan.

References 

Populated places in Lachin District